Berlinguer is a surname originating in Catalan language (while the name itself has Frankish and Lombardic origins) now found mainly in Italy (especially in Sardinia, in Sassarese territory). Notable people with the name include:

Bianca Berlinguer (born 1959), journalist, daughter of Enrico
Enrico Berlinguer (1922–1984), Italian Communist Party leader
Giovanni Berlinguer (1924–2015), Italian Democrats of the Left politician, son of Mario and brother of Enrico
Giuliana Berlinguer (1933–2014), Italian film director
Luigi Berlinguer (born 1932), politician, brother of Sergio and cousin of Enrico
Mario Berlinguer (1891–1969), Italian lawyer and politician from Sardinia, father of Enrico and Giovanni
Sergio Berlinguer (1934–2021), Italian diplomat, brother of Luigi and cousin of Enrico

Notes

Catalan-language surnames
Italian-language surnames